Oscar Kamau Kingara (July 14, 1971 - March 5, 2009) was a Kenyan lawyer and human rights activist. Kingara was the founder and director of the Oscar Foundation Free Legal Aid Clinic, a human rights organization based in Nairobi. His 2009 assassination is widely attributed to his work in documenting police killings.

Early life
Kingara was brought up in both Kiambu and Nairobi in modest and average upbringing. After graduating and acquiring a law degree, Kamau Kingara opted to venture into the family business that involved manufacturing Industries, meat and fish processing, real estate, import/ export and dealership of building materials in Kenya.

Human rights work
Kingara was director of the Keny's Oscar legal aid Foundation. He was credited with an important role in investigative work behind police killings in Kenya. In 2008, he released a report accusing Kenyan police of killing or torturing more than 8,000 people as part of a crackdown on the Mungiki criminal organization. Another report to which Kingara made major contributions, The Cry of Blood — Report on Extra-Judicial Killings and Disappearances was widely publicised by WikiLeaks.

Assassination
On March 5, 2009, Kingara and his assistant, John Paul Oulu, were ambushed and shot as they sat in rush hour traffic in a white Mercedes outside of the University of Nairobi dormitories. Kingara, who was 38 years old, was killed instantly while Oulu died soon after. The three gunmen, who were dressed in dark suits, escaped in two cars. Critics quickly pointed to elements within the Kenyan security forces and police as responsible for the assassinations. Following the assassination, WikiLeaks called for witness reports and described Kingara and Oulu as "Wikileaks-related senior human rights activists". Kenyan Prime Minister Raila Odinga condemned the killings saying, "We are hurtling towards failure as a state."

United Nations Special Rapporteur on extrajudicial killings Prof Philip Alston has urged the Kenyan Government to establish independent investigations into the killing of the two prominent human rights activists. Alston said the way the two men were killed was likely to cast suspicions on police.

References

2009 deaths
20th-century Kenyan lawyers
Kenyan human rights activists
Assassinated activists
1971 births
21st-century Kenyan lawyers
2009 in Kenya